James or Jim Reynolds may refer to:

Arts and entertainment
James Reynolds (artist) (1891-1957), American writer, painter, illustrator, set designer and costume designer
James Reynolds (actor) (born 1946), American actor
James Reynolds (composer) (born 1953), American composer of music for radio plays, theatre and opera
James Reynolds (journalist) (born 1974), BBC correspondent in Rome
Jimmy Reynolds (1904–1963), American jazz pianist

Government
Sir James Reynolds, 1st Baronet (1865–1932), British Conservative party politician
James Reynolds (Irish politician) (born 1968), Irish farmer and nationalist politician
James Reynolds (judge) (1684–1747), Chief Justice of the Irish Common Pleas
James Reynolds (junior) (1686–1739), British Member of Parliament for Bury St Edmunds, 1717–25
James B. Reynolds (1779–1851), U.S. Representative from Tennessee
James Burton Reynolds (1870–1948), Assistant Secretary of the United States Treasury where he was accused of taking bribes from the Sugar Trust
James C. Reynolds (1849–1933), Wisconsin state senator
James Henry Reynolds (1844–1932), Irish Victoria Cross recipient
James J. Reynolds (1907–1986), Undersecretary of Labor to US President Lyndon Johnson
James M. Reynolds (1830–1899), American pioneer and politician

Sports
James Reynolds (cricketer) (1866–1950), English cricketer
James Reynolds (sailor), American sailor in the Star class
Jim Reynolds (born 1968), American baseball umpire
Jim Reynolds (Canadian football) (born 1938), American football player for several CFL teams
Jim Tom Reynolds, college football player
Jimmy Reynolds (baseball) (1920–1986), American baseball player

Other people
James F. Reynolds (1919–2003), American businessman; commercial cable TV pioneer
James Reynolds, husband of Maria Reynolds, mistress of American politician Alexander Hamilton